Pterostylis setifera, commonly known as the bristly rustyhood or sikh's whiskers, is a plant in the orchid family Orchidaceae and is endemic to south-eastern Australia. It has a rosette of leaves and four to ten translucent white, green and brown flowers which have an insect-like labellum with long, bristly hairs.

Description
Pterostylis setifera, is a terrestrial,  perennial, deciduous, herb with an underground tuber. Five to eight stem leaves are wrapped around the flowering spike. The lateral sepals turn downwards, joined to each other for about half their length and are much wider than the hood. Flowering occurs from September to November.

Taxonomy and naming
Pterostylis setifera was first formally described in 1985 by Mark Clements, I.G. Matthias and David Jones from a specimen collected in the Ingalba Nature Reserve in Temora. The description was published in the Kew Bulletin. The specific epithet (setifera) is a Latin word meaning "bearing bristles".

Distribution and habitat
The bristly rustyhood grows in a variety of habitats including among rocks and in mallee vegetation. It occurs south from Narrabri in New South Wales and in scattered populations between Wedderburn and Rushworth in Victoria. It is only found the Murray botanical region in South Australia and is rare in both Victoria and South Australia.

References

setifera
Endemic orchids of Australia
Orchids of New South Wales
Orchids of Queensland
Orchids of South Australia
Orchids of Victoria (Australia)
Plants described in 1985